This is a discography for Peter Green, the founder and original lead guitarist of Fleetwood Mac in the late 1960s. During the late 1970s and early 1980s, he enjoyed a brief solo career, before further success in the late 1990s with the Peter Green Splinter Group.

With Fleetwood Mac

Singles
"I Believe My Time Ain’t Long" / "Rambling Pony" (1967)
"Shake Your Moneymaker" / "My Heart Beat Like a Hammer" (1968)
"Black Magic Woman" / "The Sun Is Shining" (1968)
"Need Your Love So Bad" / "Stop Messin’ Round" (1968)
"Albatross" / "Jigsaw Puzzle Blues" (1968)
"Man of the World" / "Somebody’s Gonna Get Their Head Kicked In Tonite" (1969)
"Oh Well Pt.1" / "Oh Well Pt. 2" (1969)
"The Green Manalishi" / "World in Harmony" (1970)
B-sides varied from country to country, and reissues often had different B-sides.

Albums
Fleetwood Mac (1968)
Mr. Wonderful (1968)
English Rose (1968) USA
Then Play On (1969)
Penguin (1973) Track 8 "Night Watch" (uncredited)
Tusk (1979) Track 13 "Brown Eyes" (uncredited)

Compilations
Fleetwood Mac in Chicago/Blues Jam in Chicago, Vols. 1–2 (1969)
The Pious Bird of Good Omen (1969)
Greatest Hits (CBS, 1971)
Greatest Hits (Warner Bros, 1988) 8× Platinum
25 Years – The Chain (1992)  
The Complete Blue Horizon Sessions 1967–1969 (1999)
The Best of Peter Green's Fleetwood Mac (2002)
The Very Best of Fleetwood Mac (2002) Platinum
The Essential Fleetwood Mac (2007)
50 Years: Don't Stop (2018)
Fleetwood Mac: Before the Beginning 1968–1970 (2019)

Archival releases
 The Original Fleetwood Mac (CBS, 1971)
 Live at the Marquee, 1967 (released 1992)
 Live at the BBC (released 1995) (UK #48)
 Masters: London Live '68 (released 1998)
 Live at the Boston Tea Party, Vols. 1–3 recorded Feb 5–7, 1970 (Snapper, 1998–2000)
 The Vaudeville Years of Fleetwood Mac: 1968 to 1970 (2 CD) (1998)
 Shrine '69 (live 1969, released 1999)
 Original Fleetwood Mac:  The Blues Years (3 CD) (Castle, 2000)
 Boston Blues (2 CD) (Recall/Snapper, 2000)
 Show-Biz Blues: 1968 to 1970 Volume 2 (2 CD) (Castle/Sanctuary, 2001)
 Jumping at Shadows: The Blues Years (Castle/Sanctuary, 2002)
 Men of the World: The Early Years (3 CD) (Sanctuary, 2005)

Solo

Singles
"Heavy Heart" / "No Way Out" (1971)
"Beasts of Burden" / "Uganda Woman" (1972) with Nigel Watson
"Apostle" / "Tribal Dance" (1978)
"In the Skies" / "Proud Pinto" (1979) – UK
"In the Skies" / "Slabo Day" (1979) – Spain
"Slabo Day" / "In the Skies" (1979) – Germany (green vinyl)
"Loser Two Times" / "Momma Don'tcha Cry" (1980) – UK
"Loser Two Times" / "Little Dreamer" (1980) – Germany
"Loser Two Times" / "Cryin' Won't Bring You Back" (1980) – Italy
"Loser Two Times" / "Walkin' the Road" (1980) – Netherlands
"Walkin' the Road" / "Woman Don't" (1980) – UK 
"Give Me Back My Freedom" / "Lost My Love" (1981)
"Promised Land" / "Bizzy Lizzy" (1981)
"The Clown" / "Time for Me to Go" (1982)
"Big Boy Now" / "Bandit" (1983)
B-sides varied from country to country.

Albums
The End of the Game (1970) Reprise RS 6436 [US]; Reprise RSLP 9006 [UK]
In the Skies (1979) PVK Records PVLS 101 [Green Vinyl version also released]
Little Dreamer (1980) PVK Records PVLS 102
Whatcha Gonna Do? (1981) PVK Records PET 1
White Sky (1982) Creole/Headline HED 1
Kolors (1983) Creole/Headline HED 2 [Picture Disc LP version also released]
A Case for the Blues (with Katmandu) (1984) Nightflite NTFL 2001

Compilations
Blue Guitar (1981) Creole CRX 5
Legend (1988) Creole CRX 12
Backtrackin' / A Rock Legend (1989) Castle TRKLP 101
Last Train to San Antone (1991) Frog FG 2-801
Baby When the Sun Goes Down (1992)
Collection (1993)
Rock and Pop Legends (1995)
Green and Guitar (1996) – Music Collection MCCD 244
Bandit (1997)
Knights of the Blues Table (1997) – Lightyear/WEA [includes "Traveling Riverside Blues" with Nigel Watson]
Blues for Dhyana (1998)
Born on the Wild Side (1998)
Alone with the Blues (2000)
The Clown (2001)
A Fool No More (2001) – Midnite Jazz & Blues Collection MJB 100
Promised Land (2001)
  The Anthology (2008)

Splinter Group albums

Peter Green Splinter Group (1997) Snapper Music SARCD 101
The Robert Johnson Songbook (1998) Snapper Music SARCD 002
Soho Session (1999) Snapper Music SDDCD 816 (2-CD)
Destiny Road (1999) Snapper Music SMACD 817
Hot Foot Powder (2000) Snapper Music SMACD 828
Me and the Devil (2001) Snapper Music SMBCD 844 (3-CD "limited edition" box set; reissue of SARCD 002 and SMACD 828, with the 3rd disc a compilation of all original Robert Johnson recordings) 
Time Traders (2001) Eagle EAGCD 193
Blues Don't Change (2001) Eagle EAGCD 200
The Best of Peter Green Splinter Group (2002 compilation of SARCD 101, SARCD 002, SDDCD 816, SMACD 817, SMACD 828) Snapper Music SMADD 849
Reaching the Cold 100 (2003) Eagle EAGCD 224

Guest contributions and other groups (albums unless stated otherwise)
With Peter B's Looners
"If You Want to Be Happy" / "Jodrell Blues" (1966 single)

With John Mayall
 "Looking Back" / "So Many Roads" (1966 single)
 "Sitting in the Rain" / "Out of Reach" (1967 single)
 "Curly" / "Rubber Duck" (1967 single)
 "Double Trouble" / "It Hurts Me Too" (1967 single)
 "Jenny" / "Picture on the Wall" (1967 single)
 A Hard Road (1967)
 All My Life (1967, 7-inch EP) - with Paul Butterfield
 "Living Alone" / "Walking on Sunset" (1968 single)
 Blues from Laurel Canyon (1968)
 Looking Back (1969 compilation)
 Thru the Years (1971 compilation)
 Along for the Ride (Eagle/Red Ink, 2001)
 Live in 1967 (Forty Below Records, 2015)
 Live in 1967, Volume 2 (Forty Below Records, 2016)

With Eddie Boyd 
Eddie Boyd and His Blues Band featuring Peter Green (1967)
"The Big Boat" / "Sent for You Yesterday" (1968 single)
7936 South Rhodes (1968)

With Duster Bennett
Smiling Like I'm Happy (1968)
"Smiling Like I'm Happy" / "Talk to Me" (1969 single)
Bright Lights (1969)
12 DB's (1970)
Out in the Blue (1995 compilation)
The Complete Blue Horizon Sessions (2005 compilation)

With Gordon Smith
Long Overdue (1968)
"Too Long" / "Funk Pedal" (1969 single)

With Otis Spann
"Walkin'" / "Temperature Is Rising (98.8F)" (1969 single)
The Biggest Thing Since Colossus (1969)
"Blues for Hippies" / "Bloody Murder" (1972 single)

With Brunning Sunflower Blues Band
Trackside Blues (1969)
I Wish You Would (1970)

With Clifford Davis
"Man of the World" / "Before the Beginning" (1969 single)
"Come On Down and Follow Me" / "Homework" (1970 single)

With Gass
Juju (1970)

With Jeremy Spencer
Jeremy Spencer (1970)

With Peter Bardens
"Homage to the God of Light Pt. 1" / "Homage to the God of Light Pt. 2" (1970 single)
The Answer (1970)
Write My Name in the Dust: The Anthology (2005 compilation)

With Memphis Slim
"Mason Dixon Line" / "Boogie Woogie" (1970 single)
"Handy Man" / "Mason Dixon Line" (1970 single)
Blue Memphis (1971)

With B. B. King
B. B. King in London (1971) Green plays on "Caldonia".

With Dave Kelly
Dave Kelly (1971)

With Country Joe McDonald
Hold On It's Coming (1971)

With Toe Fat
Toe Fat Two (1970)

With Richard Kerr
From Now Until Then (1973)

With Duffo
The Disappearing Boy (1980)

With Mick Fleetwood
The Visitor (1981)

With Brian Knight
A Dark Horse (1981)

With SAS Band
SAS Band (1997)

With Dick Heckstall-Smith
Blues and Beyond (2001)

With Chris Coco
Next Wave (2002)

With Peter Gabriel
Up (2003)

Tribute albums
 Rattlesnake Guitar: The Music of Peter Green (1995) (Reissued in 2000 as Peter Green Songbook)
 TWANG! A Tribute to Hank Marvin and the Shadows (1996) (Song – "Midnight")

References

Fleetwood Mac Legacy
[ Allmusic discography] Allmusic's complete discography of Fleetwood Mac

External links
 

Fleetwood Mac
Discographies of British artists
Blues discographies
Rock music discographies